This is a list of notable Hawaii beaches sorted by island alphabetically, clockwise around each island, listed by beach name followed by location.

Hawaii Island (Big Island)

Kauai
Some of the beaches found in Kauai are:

Lānai

Maui

Molokai

Niihau

For the beaches on Niʻihau, Clark lists 12 major beaches while Tava and Keale list 46, some of which are probably colloquial names for smaller beaches in this set:

Oahu

North Shore

East Shore

South Shore

West Shore

See also
 List of places in Hawaii
 List of beaches
 List of beaches in the United States

Notes

References

External links 

 hawaiiyeah.com

 
Beaches
Hawaii
Tourist attractions in Hawaii